The Asheville and Spartanburg Railroad was a Southern United States railroad that served South Carolina and North Carolina in the late 19th century and early 20th century.

The line was chartered as the Spartanburg and Asheville Railroad in 1873 and the following year it was consolidated with the Greenville and French Broad Railroad, a North Carolina line.

The line between Spartanburg, South Carolina, and Hendersonville, North Carolina, opened in 1879. It was sold under foreclosure in 1881 and reorganized under the Asheville and Spartanburg Railroad that same year.

The 21-mile distance between Hendersonville and Asheville, North Carolina, was completed in 1886. By that point, the line was operated as part of the Richmond and Danville Railroad until 1894 and controlled by the Southern Railway afterward.

References

Defunct South Carolina railroads
Defunct North Carolina railroads
Railway companies established in 1873
1873 establishments in South Carolina
American companies established in 1873